Waar wij steden doen verrijzen is the anthem of the province of Flevoland in the Netherlands. The lyrics were written by Mak Zeiler; Riemer van der Meulen wrote the melody. The victory over the water is central in the anthem, like in the flag of Flevoland.

Lyrics 

Regional songs
Dutch anthems
Year of song missing
Culture of Flevoland